Chernyatinskaya is a rural locality (a village) in Verkhovskoye Rural Settlement, Tarnogsky District, Vologda Oblast, Russia. The population was 4 as of 2002.

Geography 
Chernyatinskaya is located 37 km southwest of Tarnogsky Gorodok (the district's administrative centre) by road. Vlasyevskaya is the nearest rural locality.

References 

Rural localities in Tarnogsky District